The Light Rail Transit Authority (LRTA) is a public transport operator that is responsible for the construction, operation, maintenance and/or lease of Manila Light Rail Transit System in the Philippines. It is organized as a government-owned and controlled corporation under the Department of Transportation (DOTr) as an attached agency.

History 
The results of a fourteen-month study conducted between 1976 and 1977 by Freeman Fox and Associates suggested a street-level light rail line in Manila. These proposals were revised by the Ministry of Transportation and Communications, later the Department of Transportation (DOTr), to an elevated system in order to avoid building in the city's many intersections.

On July 12, 1980, President Ferdinand Edralin Marcos created the Light Rail Transit Authority through Executive Order No. 603, and assigned First Lady and Governor of Metro Manila Imelda Marcos as its chairman. While the LRTA confined its roles to policy making, fare regulation, and future planning, LRT Line 1's operations were assigned to Meralco Transit Organization (Metro, Inc.), a sister company of Meralco. The line came to be referred to as Metrorail.

Construction of Line 1 began in September 1981. The section from Baclaran to Central Terminal was opened on December 1, 1984, with all remaining stations opening on May 12, 1985.

On August 1, 2000, LRTA assumed the operational responsibility after employees of METRO, Inc. hosted a wildcat strike that paralyzed the line's operations from July 25 to August 2, 2000.

With Japan's ODA amounting to 75 billion yen in total, the construction of Line 2 began in 1996, and the first section of the line, from Santolan to Araneta Center-Cubao, was opened on April 5, 2003. The remaining stations opened exactly a year later, except for Recto station which opened on October 29, 2004.

In January 2017, LRTA Administrator Gen. Reynaldo I. Berroya (Ret.) announced the plan to establish a railway school in the country to improve the technical skills of LRTA employees and serve as a training ground for them. In May 2018, LRTA launched the first-ever train simulator manufactured by Lander Simulations and Training Solutions of Spain.

Train service 

Notes

Board of Directors
The Board of Directors is composed of eight ex-officio cabinet members namely the Secretary of the DOTr as Chairman, the respective Secretaries of the DPWH, DBM, DOF and NEDA, the Chairman of the MMDA and the LTFRB and the Administrator of the LRTA and one representative from the private sector.

The Board is tasked to issue, prescribe, and adopt policies, programs, plans, standards, guidelines, procedures, rules, and regulations for implementation, enforcement, and application by the LRTA Management. The Board also convenes to resolve operations-related issues and concerns and other matters requiring immediate attention and resolution.
 Sec. Jaime Bautista – Chairman of the Board / Department of Transportation
 Atty. Hernando T. Cabrera - Administrator - LRTA
 Sec. Benjamin Diokno – Department of Finance
 Sec. Amenah Pangadaman – Department of Budget and Management
 Chairman Romando Artes – Metro Manila Development Authority
 Sec. Manuel Bonoan – Department of Public Works and Highways
 Chairman Cheloy Grafil – Land Transportation Franchising and Regulatory Board
 Sec. Arsenio Balicasan – National Economic and Development Authority
 Atty. Dimapuno R. Datu – Private Sector

Ongoing projects

Line 1 O&M, Cavite Extension and Capacity Expansion Project 

During the presidency of Pres. Benigno Aquino III, on October 2, 2014, the Department of Transportation and Light Rail Transit Authority signed a 32-year concession agreement with Light Rail Manila Corporation, a private consortium composed of AC Infra, Metro Pacific Light Rail Corporation and Macquarie Group for the Line 1 Operations & Maintenance, construction of the Cavite Extension and Capacity Expansion.

Under the concession agreement, LRMC is responsible for the Operations & Maintenance of Line 1 and construction of the Cavite Extension while LRTA is responsible for procuring 120 new light rail vehicles for the Capacity Expansion and acquisition of the Right-of-way for the Cavite Extension.

Issues

Anomalies with the LRT Line 2 equipment 
On 4 December 2019, a fact-finding committee was formed by then-Administrator Gen. Reynaldo I. Berroya (Ret.) to review several LRT Line 2 contracts. On 21 January 2021, the Presidential Anti-Corruption Commission found inconsistencies in the procurement of equipment for the worth . The documents showed that re-railing and rolling stock diagnostic equipment for Line 2 were different from the specified brand in the bidding. The crate containing the re-railing equipment showed a sticker printout that it was shipped by Chinese firm CRRC Corporation, as ordered by the joint venture of Kempal Construction and Supply Corporation. However, documents showed that it was manufactured by Bemco, an Indian company. Irregularities were also seen in the procurement of escalators delivered by Ma-an Construction Inc. and IFE Elevators Inc, wherein the capacity of the escalators were 6,000 persons per hour, short of the required 9,000 persons per hour capacity. LRTA officials stated on 23 January that they will submit an initial report to the PACC. On 7 December 2021, LRTA filed corruption cases against some LRTA and DBM officials. DOTr Secretary Arthur Tugade has then ordered the review of other LRT-2 rehabilitation projects and blacklisting of the joint venture of Ma-an Construction Inc. and IFE Elevators Inc. The escalators and elevators were later fixed by January 2022 as one of the priority projects of the agency.

See also
 Manila Light Rail Transit System

Notes

References

External links
 Light Rail Transit Authority website

Department of Transportation (Philippines)
Government-owned and controlled corporations of the Philippines
Light rail in the Philippines
Manila Light Rail Transit System
Rail transportation in Metro Manila
Establishments by Philippine executive order